George Washington Whitmore (August 26, 1824 – October 14, 1876) was a U.S. Representative from Texas.

Born in McMinn County, Tennessee, Whitmore attended public schools. He moved to Texas in 1848. He studied law. After he was admitted to the bar, he practiced in Tyler, Texas. He served as member of the State house of representatives in 1852, 1853, and 1858. He served as district attorney for the ninth judicial district in 1866. He was appointed register in bankruptcy in 1867.

Upon the readmission of Texas, he was elected as a Republican to the Forty-first Congress and served from March 30, 1870, to March 3, 1871. He was an unsuccessful candidate for reelection in 1870 to the Forty-second Congress. He resumed the practice of law. He died in Tyler, Texas, October 14, 1876. He was interred in Oakwood Cemetery.

Sources

1824 births
1876 deaths
Republican Party members of the Texas House of Representatives
Republican Party members of the United States House of Representatives from Texas
19th-century American politicians